Elaine Scruggs (Non-Partisan), was the mayor of Glendale, Arizona, relocated from Pasadena, California with her husband Larry in 1971.  Scruggs served as mayor of Glendale from 1993 to 2013.

In 2004 she was elected as chairman of the Maricopa Association of Governments' Transportation Policy Committee which guides transportation investments.

Through her efforts, Glendale was named the first Kids at Hope city in the United States of America.

References

Women mayors of places in Arizona
Mayors of places in Arizona
People from Glendale, Arizona
Living people
Year of birth missing (living people)
20th-century American women politicians
20th-century American politicians
21st-century American women politicians
21st-century American politicians